Şehsuvar Sultan (1682 – 27 April 1756; "courage of the Şah") was a consort to the Ottoman Sultan Mustafa II (r. 1695–1703) and Valide sultan to their son Osman III (r. 1754–1757).

Life
Şahsuvar Sultan was born in 1682. She became a concubine of Sultan Mustafa. Şahsuvar and Mustafa had one son, Osman III, born on 2 January 1699, in the Edirne Palace. In 1702, Mustafa II gave her two bracelets with rubies and diamonds. 

The Edirne event saw Mustafa dethroned, with his brother Ahmed III succeeding as the new Sultan (r. 1703–1730), and Şahsuvar was sent to the Old Palace, Istanbul. On the other hand, her son, Şehzade Osman was transferred to the Topkapı Palace in Istanbul together with the entire court. 

Sultan Mahmud I, Mustafa's first son and the older half-brother of Osman, succeeded as Sultan following Patrona Halil's orchestrated riot. Mahmud was then succeeded by his half-brother Osman, thus Şahsuvar became the new Valide sultan.

Valide sultans were usually transported to Topkapı Palace by carriages. However, Şahsuvar was brought to the palace in a palanquin. The sultan, who had not seen his mother for many years, ordered his sword girding ceremony to be held a few days after the arrival of his mother to the palace.

In 1755, Şahsuvar persuaded her son, not to execute the grand vizier, Hekimoğlu Ali Pasha, who had been imprisoned in the Kız Kulesi. This proved to be an example of beneficent influence.

Death
Şahsuvar Sultan died on 27 April 1756 in the Topkapı Palace, and was buried in a separate mausoleum located at the Nuruosmaniye Mosque, Çemberlitaş, Fatih, Istanbul.

Issue
Together with Mustafa, Şahsuvar had one son and a daughter:
 Osman III (Edirne Palace, Edirne, 2 January 1699 - Istanbul, Turkey, 30 October 1757, buried in Tomb of Turhan Sultan, New Mosque, Istanbul). 25th Sultan of the Ottoman Empire. 
Emetullah Sultan (1701-19 Aprile 1727). She married once and she had a daughter.

See also
List of Valide Sultans
List of consorts of the Ottoman Sultans

References

Sources
 
 

1682 births
1756 deaths
17th-century Serbian people
18th-century Serbian people
17th-century consorts of Ottoman sultans
18th-century consorts of Ottoman sultans
Valide sultan